Virle Piemonte is a comune (municipality) in the Metropolitan City of Turin in the Italian region Piedmont, located about  southwest of Turin. It is located on the left bank of the Lemina torrent.

Virle Piemonte borders the following municipalities: Castagnole Piemonte, Osasio, Cercenasco, Vigone, and Pancalieri.

References

Cities and towns in Piedmont